Carlingford is a Canadian rural community in Victoria County, New Brunswick on the Canada–United States border between Maine and New Brunswick. Carlingford is midway between Perth-Andover and Fort Fairfield on Route 190, also known as the Fort Road, which ends at the Canada Border Services Agency inspection station.

A farming community, Carlingford's economy relies heavily on potatoes.

An Anglophone community, Carlingford students attend classes in Perth-Andover under School District 14. The schools are Southern Victoria High School, Perth Andover Middle School, and Andover Elementary School.

History

The area was named after Carlingford in Ireland.

Notable people

Corey Larlee. Corey Larlee moved to Carlingford in 1979 at the age of 3 from Tilly NB. Graduated from SVHS in 1994. From 1996 to 2000 served as an auxiliary constable with the RCMP in Perth-Andover. After the attacks of 9/11 in New York City. Mr. Larlee Joined the United States Marine Corps. During his military duty he served in Iraq and with 11th Marine Expeditionary Unit; Special Operations Capable. Earning his second expedition medal on the war on terror. After his Military service he returned home and worked in the State of Maine as a Police officer in various towns to include, Limestone, Washburn, Ashland.

See also
List of communities in New Brunswick

References
 

Communities in Victoria County, New Brunswick